Metin Türen (born May 2, 1994) is a Turkish professional basketball player for Gaziantep Basketbol of the Basketbol Süper Ligi (BSL) as a power forward.

Professional career
From 2018 to 2020 Türen played for Türk Telekom B.K. On October 9, 2020, he signed with Bursapor.

References

External links
 Metin Türen at eurobasket.com
 Metin Türen at euroleague.net
 Metin Türen at fiba.com
 Metin Türen at tblstat.net
 

1994 births
Living people
Bursaspor Basketbol players
Darüşşafaka Basketbol players
Gaziantep Basketbol players
Karşıyaka basketball players
Power forwards (basketball)
Basketball players from Istanbul
Turkish men's basketball players
Türk Telekom B.K. players
Yeşilgiresun Belediye players